This is a list of schools in the London Borough of Camden, England.

State-funded schools

Primary schools
Source. CE Church of England, RC Roman Catholic

 Abacus Belsize Primary School
 Argyle Primary School
 Beckford Primary School
 Brecknock Primary School
 Brookfield Primary School
 Christ Church Primary School, Hampstead (CE)
 Christ Church Primary School, Redhill Street (CE)
 Christopher Hatton Primary School
 Edith Neville Primary School
 Eleanor Palmer Primary School
 Emmanuel Primary School (CE)
 Fitzjohn's Primary School
 Fleet Primary School
 Gospel Oak Primary School
 Hampstead Parochial Primary School (CE)
 Hawley Primary School
 Holy Trinity and St Silas Primary School (CE)
 Holy Trinity Trinity Walk Primary School (CE)
 Kentish Town Primary School (CE)
 Kings Cross Academy
 Kingsgate Primary School
 Netley Primary School
 New End Primary School
 Our Lady Primary School (RC)
 Primrose Hill School
 Rhyl Community Primary School
 Richard Cobden Primary School
 Rosary Primary School (RC)
 St Alban's Primary School (CE)
 St Dominic's Primary School (RC)
 St Eugene de Mazenod Primary School (RC)
 St George the Martyr Primary School (CE)
 St Joseph's Primary School (RC)
 St Luke's Primary School (CE)
 St Mary & St Pancras Primary School (CE)
 St Mary's Kilburn Primary School (CE)
 St Michael's Primary School (CE)
 St Patrick's Primary School (RC)
 St Paul's Primary School (CE)
 Torriano Primary School

Secondary schools

Acland Burghley School
Camden School for Girls
Hampstead School
Haverstock School
La Sainte Union Catholic School
Maria Fidelis RC Convent School
Parliament Hill School
Regent High School
UCL Academy
William Ellis School

Special and alternative schools

Camden Centre for Learning
Camden Primary Pupil Referral Unit
CCfL Key Stage 3 PRU
CCfL Key Stage 4 PRU
Children's Hospital School at Gt Ormond Street and UCH
Frank Barnes Primary School for Deaf Children
Royal Free Hospital Children's School
Swiss Cottage School
Wac Arts College

Further education
City Literary Institute
LaSWAP Sixth Form
Mary Ward Centre
Westminster Kingsway College
Working Men's College

Independent schools

Primary and preparatory schools

The Academy School
Broadhurst School
The Cavendish School
City Junior School
Devonshire House Preparatory School
The Hall School
Hampstead Hill School  
Hereward House School
La Petite Ecole Bilingue
Lyndhurst House Preparatory School
Maria Montessori School
The Mulberry House School
St Anthony's School
St Christopher's School 
St Mary's School Hampstead
Sarum Hall School
Trevor-Roberts School 
The Village School

Senior and all-through schools

CATS College London
Collège Français Bilingue de Londres 
Ecole Jeannine Manuel
Fine Arts College
Heathside School
LSI Independent College
North Bridge House School
St Margaret's School 
South Hampstead High School 
Southbank International School
University College School

Special and alternative schools
Gloucester House, The Tavistock Children's Day Unit

Notes
All list retrieved from here.

References 

Schools in the London Borough of Camden
Camden